Together is a 1979 album by jazz pianist McCoy Tyner released on the Milestone label. It was recorded in August and September 1978 and features performances by Tyner with trumpeter Freddie Hubbard, flautist Hubert Laws, tenor saxophonist/bass clarinetist Bennie Maupin, vibraphonist Bobby Hutcherson, bassist Stanley Clarke, drummer Jack DeJohnette and percussionist Bill Summers.

Reception
The Allmusic review by Scott Yanow states "The music is essentially high-quality advanced modal hard bop and each of the sidemen get their opportunities to be showcased".

Track listing
 "Nubia" (Tyner) - 8:08
 "Shades of Light" (Laws) - 7:43
 "Bayou Fever" (DeJohnette) - 4:49
 "One of Another Kind" (Hubbard) - 7:05
 "Ballad for Aisha" (Tyner) - 7:19
 "Highway One" (Hutcherson) - 6:11

Personnel
McCoy Tyner: piano
Freddie Hubbard: trumpet, flugelhorn
Hubert Laws: flute, alto flute
Bennie Maupin: tenor saxophone, bass clarinet
Bobby Hutcherson: vibes, marimba
Stanley Clarke: bass
Jack DeJohnette: drums
Bill Summers: conga, percussion

References

McCoy Tyner albums
1979 albums
Milestone Records albums
Albums produced by Orrin Keepnews